Robyn Butler is an Australian writer, actress and producer who is best known for her starring role in the television comedy series The Librarians. Butler hosted a radio program called Tough Love on the Triple M network. She is married to actor Wayne Hope with whom she runs the production company Gristmill, and is also the mother of actress Molly Daniels.

Butler wrote, produced, directed and performed in Stories from the Golf and The Librarians. She also produced and wrote Very Small Business and Upper Middle Bogan.

Television
 Little Lunch
 Upper Middle Bogan
 The Librarians
 Very Small Business
 Stories from the Golf
 Micallef Tonight
 Welcher & Welcher
 The Micallef Program
 The InBESTigators 
 Short Cuts
 Thank God You're Here
 The Mick Molloy Show
 Small Tales and True
 SheZow
 Talkin' 'Bout Your Generation

Movies
 Crackerjack (2002)
 BoyTown (2006)
 Now Add Honey (2015)

Radio
 Tough Love with Mick Molloy (Triple M network 2003–2005)

References

External links
 

Year of birth missing (living people)
Living people
Australian women writers
Australian actresses
21st-century Australian women
20th-century Australian women
Australian television producers